Two ships of the United States Navy have been named Crockett, presumably after counties in Tennessee and Texas.

  was launched 28 November 1944.
  was stricken from the Naval Register on 15 December 1976.

Sources

United States Navy ship names